The Girl in the Picture is a 1957 British crime film directed by Don Chaffey and starring Donald Houston and Patrick Holt.

Plot
A photo submitted to a newspaper for a competition attracts the attention of crime reporter John Deering (Donald Houston). It shows the getaway car used in a robbery which lead to the unsolved murder of a policeman, and a glamorous woman (Junia Crawford) waving to the car's driver. Deering undertakes to find the woman, believing she may hold the key to the killer's identity. However, the murderer is also alerted and attempts to silence the girl in the picture.

Cast
 Donald Houston as John Deering
 Patrick Holt as Inspector Bliss
 Junia Crawford as Pat Dryden
 Maurice Kaufmann as Rod Molloy
 Paddy Joyce as Jack Bates
 Tom Chatto as George Keefe
 John Paul as Detective Sergeant Nelson
 John Miller as Duncan
 Colin Cleminson as Stanley Eames
 Stuart Saunders as Newspaper editor
 Bee Duffell as Mrs Stokes
 David Greever as Office boy
 James Booth as Office boy (credited as David Greeves)
 John Watson as Policeman
 Lucette Marimar as Model

Critical reception
TV Guide called the film "Enjoyable but familiar," and rated it 2/5 stars.

References

External links

1957 films
British crime films
British black-and-white films
1957 crime films
Films directed by Don Chaffey
Films set in London
1950s English-language films
1950s British films